Barre City Hall and Opera House is a historic government building at 6 North Main Street in downtown Barre, Vermont.  Built in 1899, it houses the city offices, and its upper floors have served for much of the time since its construction as a performing arts venue.  The building was listed on the National Register of Historic Places in 1973.

Description and history
Barre City Hall stands near the eastern end of the city's commercial business district, on the west side of Vermont City Park, a triangular park formed by North Main, Church, and Washington Streets.  It is a four-story brick and stone building with Beaux Arts styling.  The main feature of its facade is a three-story recessed arch, flanked by pilasters and topped by a gabled pediment.  Within this recess, the main entrance is framed by ironwork and topped by a series of arcaded windows.  Above these windows a wrought iron arched balcony spans the arch, whose interior is capped by a large half-round fanlight.  The interior of the building houses city offices on the ground floor, and the facilities of the opera house on the upper three floors.

The city hall was built in 1899 to a design by George Adams, a native of Lancaster, New Hampshire.  Its theater was used until World War I for all manner of performances, meetings, and lectures, and fell into decline with the advent of motion pictures.  Although it was modified to show films, the decline continued, and the theater was closed in 1940.  Community support led to the theater's reopening in 1982, and by the 2000s it had been fully restored with updated amenities.  It is one of northern New England's best-preserved theatrical spaces of the turn of the 20th century.

See also
National Register of Historic Places listings in Washington County, Vermont

References

External links
Barre Opera House
City of Barre

Government buildings on the National Register of Historic Places in Vermont
National Register of Historic Places in Washington County, Vermont
Government buildings completed in 1899
Buildings and structures in Barre (city), Vermont
Individually listed contributing properties to historic districts on the National Register in Vermont